Liga Leumit (lit. National League) is the second division of the Israeli Football League, and below its Premier League.

Structure
There are 16 clubs in the league. At the end of each season, the two lowest-placed teams are relegated to Liga Alef while the two highest-placed teams from Liga Alef are promoted in their place. The two highest-placed Liga Leumit teams are promoted to the Israeli Premier League while the bottom two teams from Israeli Premier League are relegated in their place.

The participating clubs were first play a conventional round-robin schedule for a total of 30 matches, with all points accumulated by the clubs are halved.

Following this, the top eight teams will first play in a promotion playoff. To determine the promoted teams. and the eight clubs play a single round-robin schedule.

The Israeli State Cup winners qualify for the third qualifying round of the 2013–14 UEFA Europa League.

In addition, the bottom eight teams play out to avoid two relegation spots.

Broadcast rights

Television
Since the 2010–11 season, one match is broadcast live on Sport +5 LIVE channel on Friday or Saturday afternoons. The rest have no TV coverage.

History
Liga Leumit came into existence at the start of the 1955–56 season, replacing Liga Alef as the top division in Israeli football. However, it was usurped as the top flight in the 1999–2000 season, when it was replaced by the Premier League. Since then it has operated as the second tier in the Israeli football league system.

Current Liga Leumit clubs

The following clubs are participating in the 2022–23 season:

Past seasons champions

In bold team that won the Championship

Record of finishing positions of clubs in the Liga Leumit 

Table correct as at the end of the 2021–22 Israeli Liga Leumit season.

External links
Israel Football Association
Liga Leumit Soccerway

  
2
Isr
Professional sports leagues in Israel